The discography of Aly & AJ (briefly known as 78violet), an American pop rock duo, consists of four studio albums, one video album, two extended plays and compilation albums, 32 singles,  10 music videos and various album appearances. They released their debut studio album Into the Rush on August 17, 2005. The album debuted at number 36 in the United States, selling over 24,000 copies in its first week and was later certified Gold by the RIAA. Into the Rush earned them the "Contemporary Inspirational Artists of the Year" nomination at the 2006 American Music Awards. Into the Rush has sold 839,000 copies in the United States and 1,000,000 worldwide.

In 2006, the duo released their second studio and first Holiday album, Acoustic Hearts of Winter, which peaked at 78 on the Billboard 200 and sold 110,000 copies. Their third studio album, Insomniatic, debuted at number 15 on the Billboard 200, selling over 39,000 copies in its first week, making it their highest debut to date. The album's lead single, "Potential Breakup Song", is their most successful single to date, it was certified Platinum and managed to peak at number 17 on Billboard Hot 100, becoming their first top 20 and international hit.

In 2013, the duo released a single under the name '78violet' titled "Hothouse", which was their only single release under this name. In 2017, the duo returned with a new single titled "Take Me," which was released under their original name. They have since released various songs that have been compiled onto an album, We Don't Stop (2020), and released their fourth studio album in May 2021, their first album in 14 years.

Albums

Studio albums

Compilation albums

Video albums

Extended plays

Singles

Other appearances

Music videos

As lead artist

Guest appearances

Notes

References

Discographies of American artists
Rock music group discographies
Discography